This is the list of karst areas located in Estonia. The list is incomplete.

References

External links
 Category:Karst areas in Estonia, Estonian Wikipedia

Karst areas
Karst
Karst